During the 1968-1969 season Milan Associazione Calcio competed in Serie A, Coppa Italia and European Cup.

Summary 
For the season the club office confirmed Nereo Rocco as manager. In June 1968, Anquilletti, Lodetti, Prati, Rivera e Rosato became European champions with National Team winners of UEFA Euro 1968. Loan in Romano Fogli and return Luigi Maldera after 2 years of loan out.

In league the squad competed against Cagliari and Fiorentina in the race of the trophy. In quarterfinals of Coppa Italia Torino, defeated Milan 1-0 both games.

In European Cup the squad reached the Final after defeated in Round of 32  Malmö FF (lost 1–2 at Malmö and won 4–1 in Milan), The team did not play the Eightfinals due to Eastern European teams abandoned the tournament, qualifying to the Quarterfinals now to match against Celtic Glasgow  (draw 0–0 in Home and 1-0 won away), in semifinals the club defeated English squad Manchester United champions last year (won 2–0 at San Siro and lost 1–0 at Old Trafford), including stars such as George Best and World Cup champion Bobby Charlton.

Final of the Euro tournament was disputed on 28 May 1969 in Madrid against Netherlands' club  Ajax won by Milan with a 4-1 thanks to a hat-trick of Pierino Prati and 1 goal of Sormani after rivals scored by penalty on Vasović. The club clinched its second title ever.

Squad 

 (Captain)

 (vice-captain)

Transfers

Summer

Autumn

Competitions

Serie A

League table

Matches

Coppa Italia

First  round

Group 1

Quarterfinals

European Cup

Round of 32

Round of 16
On starting of competition due to political issues related to Spring of Prague, the next teams abandoned the tournament:

 Dinamo Kiev
 Ferencváros
 Levski Sofia
 Ruch Chorzów
 Carl Zeiss Jena

As a result, Milan, Benfica and  Crvena Zvezda, qualified on table to the next round.

Quarterfinals

Semifinals

Final

Statistics

Squad statistics

Players statistics

See also 
 A.C. Milan

References

Bibliography

External links 

A.C. Milan seasons
Milan
UEFA Champions League-winning seasons